Samba is a variety of rice grown in Tamil Nadu, some other parts of India and Sri Lanka, and has a small ovular grain, compared to the long grain of basmati rice.

Description 
Samba rice has a distinct taste and can be described as having a more 'starchy' or 'corny' flavor.And also liked by many as it tastes better than other rice and also it becomes less harder after cooking..

The grain itself is much harder than the other varieties and when cooked is less 'fluffy' in texture so gives a more filling meal with a higher caloric value.

All Samba rice grain is harvested locally by the mallas of India and there are many sub-varieties ranging in grain size and price. Seeraga Samba is the most expensive sub-variety and has the finest grain. It is approximately a third the size of a grain of basmati rice.

Cultivation 
Samba rice is grown extensively in the South Indian state of Tamil Nadu. Rice grown in Samba season (August through January) is referred to as Samba rice. This rice is grown for a longer duration compared to other types of rice.

See also
Traditional rice varieties of Tamil Nadu
List of rice varieties

References

Tamil cuisine
Rice varieties
Sri Lankan cuisine
Agriculture in Tamil Nadu
Rice production in India